The 2015 Bristol City Council election took place on 7 May 2015 to elect members of Bristol City Council in England. This was on the same day as other local elections.

In March 2015, the only Independent Councillor on Bristol City Council joined the Conservatives. This meant that the Conservatives increased their number of seats from the previous Council despite making no gains in the May election.

Ward results

Ashley

Bedminster

Bishopsworth

Brislington East

Brislington West

Cabot

Clifton

Clifton East

Cotham

Easton

Eastville

Filwood

Frome Vale

Hartcliffe

Hengrove

Hillfields

Knowle

Lawrence Hill

Southville

St George East

St George West

Stockwood

Whitchurch Park

Windmill Hill

Council make up
After the 2015 local election, the  political make up of the council was as follows:

References

2015 English local elections
May 2015 events in the United Kingdom
2015
2010s in Bristol